Shortcut: Disto Pan Nasto is a 2015 Indian Marathi-language romantic thriller film written and directed by Harish Raut and produced by M.K Motion Pictures & Chitrakar Films. Shortcut was scheduled to be theatrically released on 7 August 2015.

It is based on the life of protagonist, Rohit (Vaibbhav Tatwawdi) an ace computer hacker who mysteriously gets into a legal hassle for a huge hacking case. The case is helmed by cop Rajesh Shringarpure, a no nonsense police officer. Meanwhile, his love is tested with Ishika (Sanskruti Balgude).

Synopsis
"Shortcut: Disato Pan Nasato" is a story of Rohit Pradhan (Vaibbhav Tatwawdi), a 20-year-old introvert guy from a middle-class family. With lack of any interesting hobbies and spoken skills, suppressed thoughts, social fear he never managed to create his identity among his friends since his childhood. He has never felt his existence in the society. On the flipside, he is genius of computer algorithms and hacking. He is desperately in search for a unique identity and dreams of becoming noticeable to all. 
Enters Ishika (Sanskruti Balgude), a charming, beautiful, intelligent, bit Stubborn girl with a lovely smile. And it’s a love at first sight for Rohit. Rohit uses his amazing hacking skills to impress Ishika, and their combination works. 
We see Rohit taking up hacking as a part-time business; he does for the good of society. He thus, starts to carve his own identity. He excels in every code he inputs and goes on to hack a leading radio channel’s system that makes him win an all new Audi.  With this new found confidence, Rohit proposes to Ishika and things look positive for him. 
But the happiness gets cut short, when ACP,  Rajesh Nibalkar, books him under the charges of being the most wanted cyber criminal, with his IP address as evidence against him.

Filming

Shooting of the film started at the end of 2014, in Mumbai And Karjat. It was shot on various locations in Lonavala and Out of Mumbai, and directed by Harish Raut.

Cast

Soundtrack

References

http://epaperbeta.timesofindia.com/Article.aspx?eid=31814&articlexml=New-actresses-to-scorch-Marathi-film-screens-21072014105013
https://twitter.com/sanskruti19/status/486403364054237185
http://marathistars.tumblr.com/post/90775899623/shortcut-a-marathi-film-on-cyber-crime-there
http://rangmarathi.com/i-left-television-to-do-something-worthy-in-films-sanskruti-balgude/
http://timesofindia.indiatimes.com/entertainment/marathi/music/Remo-DSouza-F-A-L-T-U-Anybody-Can-Dance-Rajesh-Shringarpure-Rajesh-Shringarpure-Sanskruti-Balgude/articleshow/37825098.cms?
http://www.muhurtnews.com/1916/
http://www.zeetalkies.com/gossip/pinjara-to-shortcut-was-a-great-learning-experience-sanskruti-balgude.html
http://zagmag.net/movie/shortcut-marathi-movie-music-launch.html
https://www.youtube.com/watch?v=1eAGhniHBro

External links 
www.facebook.com/ShortcutTheMovie
www.twitter.com/shortcutmarathi

2015 films
Indian thriller films
2010s Marathi-language films
2015 thriller films